Alva is a surname of Portuguese origin derived from the place of habitation. The surname also occurs among the Bunt people of Karnataka, India. It is an alternate form of a dynastic title of the Alupa royal family. It is also found among Mangalorean Christians.

Notable people
The following is a list of notable people with last name Alva.

A. Shanker Alva (born 1906), Indian politician and lawyer
Bartolomé de Alva (born 1590s), Novohispanic mestizo secular priest and Nahuatl translator
Jeevaraj Alva (died 2001), Indian politician
Joachim Alva (1907–1979), Indian freedom fighter, journalist and politician
K. Nagappa Alva (born 1908), Indian politician
Leonel Mário d'Alva, Prime Minister of São Tomé and Príncipe (1974–1975)
Luigi Alva, Peruvian opera singer
Margaret Alva (born 1942), first woman governor of the Indian state of Uttarakhand, daughter-in-law of Joachim Alva
Piero Alva (born 1979), Peruvian footballer
Ramón Alva de la Canal (1892–1985), Mexican painter and illustrator
Tony Alva (born 1957), American skateboarder, entrepreneur, and musician
Violet Alva (1908–1969), Indian politician, wife of Joachim Alva
Walter Alva (born 1951), Peruvian archaeologist

References

Indian surnames
Karnataka society
Bunt community surnames